José Daniel Tehuitzil Rosas (born November 8, 1988, in Puebla City, Puebla) is a former Mexican professional footballer who last played as a midfielder for Liga de Expansión MX club Tlaxcala.

Honours
FC Juárez
Ascenso MX: Apertura 2015

Lobos BUAP
Ascenso MX: Clausura 2017

Oaxaca
Ascenso MX: Apertura 2017

External links
 
 

Living people
1988 births
Association football midfielders
Lobos BUAP footballers
FC Juárez footballers
Alebrijes de Oaxaca players
Liga MX players
Ascenso MX players
Liga Premier de México players
People from Puebla (city)
Footballers from Puebla
Mexican footballers